Presidential elections were held in Haiti on 26 November 2000. The opposition parties, organised into the recently created Convergence Démocratique, boycotted the election after disputing the results of the parliamentary elections. The result was a landslide victory for Jean-Bertrand Aristide, who received 91.7% of the vote with a turnout of around 50%.

Concerns were raised when the Organisation of American States conducted a fact-finding mission on the election and found that 10 senatorial seats in the simultaneous parliamentary elections should have gone to a second-round runoff because the candidates did not win an absolute majority as required by the constitution. This resulted in the European Union and the United States banning economic assistance to the country until 2005, which were supported by Haitian opposition members.

Results

References

Haiti
Presidential
Presidential elections in Haiti
Election and referendum articles with incomplete results